The Military ranks of Cambodia are the military insignia used by the Royal Cambodian Armed Forces.

Commissioned officer ranks
The rank insignia of commissioned officers.

Other ranks
The rank insignia of non-commissioned officers and enlisted personnel.

See also
 Military ranks of the People's Republic of Kampuchea

References

External links
 
 

Cambodia
Military of Cambodia
Military ranks of Cambodia